Bahrabad may refer to:
 Bahrabad, Kerman
 Bahrabad, Razavi Khorasan
 Bahrabad, Sistan and Baluchestan